Villa Unión is the second largest town in the municipality of Mazatlán, after the port of Mazatlán. It is located twenty kilometers south of the city on the banks of the Presidio River.

References

Populated places in Sinaloa